The 1983 Hofmeister World Doubles was the second staging of the doubles professional snooker tournament. It was played between 9 and 18 December 1983 with the tournament televised on ITV now showing it in eight days.

The venue was the Derngate in Northampton which proved to be a better environment for snooker matches than the National Sports Centre used the previous year. Steve Davis and Tony Meo successfully defended their title, beating Tony Knowles and Jimmy White 10–2 in the final. They also won the highest combined break prize with 196 from their semi-final, with Davis compiling a 140 and Meo making a 56.The event was sponsored by Courage, and the total prize fund was £75,000 including £25,000 for the winning pair.

Main draw

Miles /Ganim were disqualified after Miles failed to turn up.

Earlier Rounds
A pre-qualifying round and qualifying round took place leading up to the first round.

Pre-qualifying

Qualifying

First round

References

World Doubles Championship
World Doubles Championship
World Doubles Championship